The appointment of committees and joint committees under section 102 of the Local Government Act 1972 is a legal provision for councils in England.

Adur and Worthing Joint Committee
Anglia Revenues and Benefits Partnership Joint Committee  
Bramcote Crematorium Joint Committee 
Central Durham Crematorium Joint Committee   
Chilterns Crematorium Joint Committee   
Chorley and South Ribble Shared Services Joint Committee   
CNC Building Control Partnership Joint Committee   
Cleveland Emergency Planning Joint Committee 
Colchester and Ipswich Museum Service Joint Committee   
Devon Building Control Partnership Joint Committee   
Eastern Sea Fisheries Joint Committee 
Eltham Crematorium Joint Committee 
Humber Emergency Planning Service 
Lincs Building Consultancy Joint Committee   
National Parking Adjudication Service Joint Committee   
Portchester Crematorium Joint Committee  
Public Protection Partnership Joint Committee  
Sheffield and Rotherham Emergency Planning Service
Shropshire Waste Partnership Joint Committee 
Somerset Waste Partnership Joint Committee 
South Downs Joint Committee 
South Worcestershire Shared Services Partnership Joint Committee  
Staffordshire Connects Joint Committee
Tamar Bridge and Torpoint Ferry Joint Committee
Tayside Contracts Joint Committee
Three Rivers and Watford Shared Services Joint Committee
West Yorkshire Joint Services Committee

See also
 Joint committee of the Parliament of the United Kingdom

References

 
Local government in the United Kingdom
Government commissions
Local government-related lists